Gefarnate is a drug used for the treatment of gastric ulcers.

It also has been proposed for use in the treatment of dry eye syndrome.

References

Drugs acting on the gastrointestinal system and metabolism
Carboxylate esters
Polyolefins